Henry Edward Moberly (born 11 December 1822 at Madras; died 22 September 1907 at Winchester, Hampshire) was an English cleric and school housemaster. As an amateur cricketer, he played first-class cricket from 1842 to 1845.

Life
The eldest son of Lt-Col. Henry Moberly of Madras, Moberly was educated at Winchester College and New College, Oxford. He played cricket for Oxford University, making 10 known appearances in first-class matches.

Moberly matriculated at New College in 1841, graduating B.A. in 1845, and was a Fellow there from 1841 to 1860. He was ordained as a Church of England priest and became Dean of Divinity at New College in 1851, bursar in 1853 and sub-warden in 1856. He taught at Winchester College 1859–80 and founded one of the oldest boarding houses at Winchester, still known formally as Moberly's. He then became a parish priest and was vicar of Heckfield, Hampshire, 1880–83 and rector of St Michael's, Winchester, from 1883.

F. D. How included Moberly in the 1904 book Six Great Schoolmasters.

References

External links
 CricketArchive profile

1822 births
1907 deaths
English cricketers
English cricketers of 1826 to 1863
Oxford University cricketers
People educated at Winchester College
Alumni of New College, Oxford
Fellows of New College, Oxford
Schoolteachers from Hampshire
19th-century English Anglican priests
People from Chennai